Hypsopygia vulgaris is a species of snout moth in the genus Hypsopygia. It was described by Jean Ghesquière in 1942. It is found in the Democratic Republic of the Congo.

References

Moths described in 1942
Pyralini